The International Encyclopedia of Statistical Science is a statistical sciences reference published by Springer. It has been described as one of the scientific projects with the largest number of involved countries ever, since it includes contributors coming from 105 countries and six continents. It contains the last papers written by Hirotugu Akaike, Nobel Laureate Sir Clive Granger, John Nelder and Erich Leo Lehmann.

The first edition, in three volumes, was edited by Miodrag Lovrić and appeared in December 2010. It is published by Springer and it is available in print and online form.

See also
 Encyclopedia of Statistical Sciences

References

External links 
 Publisher's webpage for this Encyclopedia

Statistical Sciences
Mathematics books
Statistics books